Gibson Company Building is a historic industrial / commercial building located at Indianapolis, Indiana.  It was built in 1916–1917, and is a five-story, rectangular reinforced concrete building over a basement. It has brick and terra cotta curtain walls. The building features Chicago style windows with Italian Renaissance style detailing.  It was originally built to house an automobile assembler, supplier, and showroom.

It was listed on the National Register of Historic Places in 2009.

References

External links

Industrial buildings and structures on the National Register of Historic Places in Indiana
Commercial buildings on the National Register of Historic Places in Indiana
Renaissance Revival architecture in Indiana
Industrial buildings completed in 1917
Commercial buildings completed in 1917
Buildings and structures in Indianapolis
National Register of Historic Places in Indianapolis
Chicago school architecture in Indiana